Events from the year 1723 in Scotland.

Incumbents 

 Secretary of State for Scotland: The Duke of Roxburghe

Law officers 
 Lord Advocate – Robert Dundas
 Solicitor General for Scotland – John Sinclair, jointly with Charles Binning

Judiciary 
 Lord President of the Court of Session – Lord North Berwick
 Lord Justice General – Lord Ilay
 Lord Justice Clerk – Lord Grange

Events 
 8 June – The Honourable Society of Improvers in the Knowledge of Agriculture in Scotland is formed in Edinburgh by over 300 landowners, part of the Scottish Enlightenment.
 11 November – 18 people drown in the River Tweed near Melrose when a ferry boat capsizes.

Births 
 3 February – Catherine Read, portrait painter (died 1778 at sea)
 c. 5 February (16 February NS) – John Witherspoon, Presbyterian minister, a Founding Father of the U.S. and President of the College of New Jersey (modern-day Princeton University; died 1794 in the United States)
 23 February – William Chambers, architect (born in Gothenburg; died 1796 in London)
 5 June (baptized; 16 June NS) – Adam Smith, economist and philosopher (died 1790)
 20 June (1 July NS) – Adam Ferguson, philosopher and social historian (died 1816)
 29 August – William Dalrymple, Church of Scotland minister (died 1814)
 Lady Anne Farquharson-MacKintosh, Jacobite (died 1784)
 Gavin Hamilton, neoclassical history painter, archaeologist and dealer (died 1798 in Rome)
 Francis Peacock, "father of Scottish country dance" (died 1807)

Deaths 
 3 April – George Watson, accountant and benefactor (born 1654)

The arts
 Mavisbank House in Midlothian is designed by William Adam in collaboration with his client, Sir John Clerk of Penicuik, and construction begins; it is the first Palladian villa in Scotland.
Cairney-born painter William Aikman settles in London as a portraitist under the patronage of John Campbell, Duke of Argyll.

See also 

 Timeline of Scottish history

References 

 
Years of the 18th century in Scotland
Scotland
1720s in Scotland